The Estadi Municipal Palamós Costa Brava is a multi-use stadium located in Palamós, Catalonia, Spain. It is currently used for football matches and is the home stadium of Palamós CF.

History
Palamós Costa Brava was inaugurated on 29 August 1989 under the name of Nou Estadi Municipal de Palamós, being the new home stadium of Palamós CF and replacing Camp de Cervantes. Its first match was a 2–1 friendly win against neighbours FC Barcelona on the same day.

The stadium's first competitive match took charge on 10 September, a 1–1 draw against Levante UD for the Segunda División championship. This was the club's most successful period, as it remained in the second level for six consecutive campaigns.

On 7 July 2014 the stadium was named as the new home ground of UE Llagostera for the following five seasons, as the club's stadium, Estadi Municipal de Llagostera, didn't meet the LFP criteria. On 2 August, it was renamed to Estadi Municipal Palamós Costa Brava.

In the 2015 summer, the stadium was renovated by adding seats in all the stands, and had its capacity reduced to 3,724 spectators. On 27 July 2021, Llagostera announced that the club would play in the stadium again for the ensuing campaign; four days later, the club changed name to UE Costa Brava.

International Football Matches

References

External links
Llagostera profile 
Estadios de España 
Soccerway profile

Football venues in Catalonia
Palamós CF
UE Costa Brava
Sports venues completed in 1989